Utica is a borough in Venango County, Pennsylvania, United States. The population was 184 at the 2020 census.

The current Mayor of Utica is MaryAnn Schell.

Geography
Utica is located at  (41.436319, -79.956341).

Demographics

As of the census of 2000, there were 211 people, 79 households, and 57 families residing in the borough.  The population density was 157.2 people per square mile (60.8/km2). There were 122 housing units at an average density of 90.9 per square mile (35.2/km2). The racial makeup of the borough was 100.00% White.

There were 79 households, out of which 43.0% had children under the age of 18 living with them, 48.1% were married couples living together, 16.5% had a female householder with no husband present, and 27.8% were non-families. 26.6% of all households were made up of individuals, and 8.9% had someone living alone who was 65 years of age or older. The average household size was 2.67 and the average family size was 3.26.

In the borough the population was spread out, with 36.5% under the age of 18, 3.3% from 18 to 24, 25.1% from 25 to 44, 23.2% from 45 to 64, and 11.8% who were 65 years of age or older. The median age was 34 years. For every 100 females there were 83.5 males. For every 100 females age 18 and over, there were 88.7 males.

The median income for a household in the borough was $22,875, and the median income for a family was $23,929. Males had a median income of $29,063 versus $19,250 for females. The per capita income for the borough was $11,435. About 30.4% of families and 29.2% of the population were below the poverty line, including 48.1% of those under the age of eighteen and none of those 65 or over.

References

 

Boroughs in Venango County, Pennsylvania
Populated places established in 1830
1830 establishments in Pennsylvania